The Shakopee Formation is a geologic formation in Illinois, Indiana, Wisconsin, and Minnesota. It preserves fossils dating back to the Ordovician period. It is named after the town of Shakopee, Minnesota, where the formation can be seen in bluffs along the Minnesota River

See also

 List of fossiliferous stratigraphic units in Illinois
 List of fossiliferous stratigraphic units in Minnesota

References

 

Ordovician Illinois
Ordovician Minnesota
Ordovician southern paleotemperate deposits